Kevin Heijstek (born April 19, 1988) is a Dutch professional baseball pitcher, for Amsterdam Pirates in the Dutch Baseball League. He had previously played for DOOR Neptunus since 2005, before joining Amsterdam for 2013.

He also played for the Netherlands national baseball team in the 2009 World Port Tournament, 2010 Intercontinental Cup, 2013 World Baseball Classic, 2014 European Baseball Championship, and 2015 WBSC Premier 12.

References

External links

Dutch baseball players
Baseball pitchers
2013 World Baseball Classic players
2015 WBSC Premier12 players
2017 World Baseball Classic players
Sportspeople from Dordrecht
1988 births
Living people
DOOR Neptunus players
L&D Amsterdam Pirates players